HMS Kingfisher (also spelled King's Fisher or Kingsfisher) was the second ship in the 14-gun  of ship sloops, to which design 25 vessels were built in the 1760s and 1770s. She was launched on 13 July 1770 at Chatham Dockyard, and completed there on 21 November 1770. She took part in the American Revolutionary War, enforcing the blockade of the Delaware Bay, and served in the Battle of Turtle Gut Inlet, near Cape May, New Jersey. While under the temporary command of Lieutenant Hugh Christian, she was burnt by her own crew to avoid capture on 7 August 1778 in Narragansett Bay during the Battle of Rhode Island.

Service history
Kingfisher was commissioned in September 1770 under Commander Thomas Jordan, and sailed for North America on 1 August 1771. In September 1772 command passed to Commander Jacob Lobb, then on 9 April 1773 Commander George Montagu, (Her Captain on 1 January 1775 is listed as Cpt. Jas Montagu.)  and in November 1775 under Commander Alexander Graeme.

Norfolk
Kingfisher under Commander Montagu arrived at Norfolk, Virginia on 8 September 1775, along with  under Commander Graeme and  under Commander Matthew Squire. On 30 September 1775, the mayor and council of Norfolk wrote to Lord Dunmore about the "illegal and riotous" behaviour of the crews of Kingfisher and Otter.

On 1 January 1776, she began a heavy bombardment of Norfolk along with Liverpool and Otter, setting the town on fire.

Delaware Bay

Early on the morning of 29 June 1776, Kingfisher and Orpheus resumed chase.
Nancy, to evade capture of her supplies of gunpowder and arms, ran aground at Turtle Gut Inlet.
In the ensuing battle, Nancy was set on fire and exploded, killing the master's mate and six men on longboats from Kingfisher. Also during 1776, Orpheus and Kingfisher captured the Adrian, which was sailing from Philadelphia to France with a cargo of tobacco, flour, bread and staves.

Narragansett Bay
On 27 August 1777, Kingfisher under Commander Graeme engaged the newly built 14-gun Oliver Cromwell under Captain Samuel Chace, Jr., ran her ashore, and  burnt her. During the fight, the brigantine  escaped.

On 7 February 1778, Kingfisher under Lieutenant Hugh Christian was stationed in the Sakonnet Passage to Narragansett Bay. On 30 May, Christian led the boats of the squadron, which were carrying a detachment of troops, in an attack on the saw mills on a creek near Taunton River. The attack was successful.

Between 29 May and 18 July, the British captured a number of vessels: the sloops Sally and Fancy, snow Baron D'Ozell, Olive Branch, sloop Betsey, and schooner Sally.

French Admiral d'Estaing's squadron arrived in Narragansett Bay on 29 July 1778 to support the American army under General George Washington during the battle of Rhode Island. As Kingfisher lay in Sakonnet Passage, Christian moved her into Foglands Bay. There she landed all her guns and stores. On 30 July he and her crew abandoned her and set her on fire to prevent the French from capturing her. The Royal Navy ended up having to destroy ten of their own vessels in all.

Lieutenant Christian went on to command the armed ship Vigilant, of 20 guns and 150 men.

See also
 Burning of Norfolk
 Battle of Turtle Gut Inlet
 Battle of Rhode Island

Citations and references

Citations

References
 
 
 
 
 
 
 

 Winfield, Rif, British Warships in the Age of Sail 1714–1792: Design, Construction, Careers and Fates. Seaforth Publishing, 2007. .

External links
 

Kingfisher (1770)
1770 ships
Swan-class ship-sloops
Ships built in Chatham